Babesia caballi is a species belonging to Alveolata and the family Babesiidae. In horses, it causes the babesiosis disease, called "equine babesiosis". Its length is 2.5-5 µm, while its width is 2 µm. It is usually oval-shaped. Its vector and second feeders are ticks. In North America B. caballi is being spread by Dermacentor nitens.

Bibliography 
 
 

caballi